The Countdown Spectacular is a series of concerts reviving the nostalgia of the Australian music television series Countdown.

Countdown Spectacular
The first tour was staged from June to August 2006. It featured mainly Australian artists and groups, some re-forming specially for the tour, plus several international artists now living in Australia. Artists and groups performing on the tour included:

 Joe Camilleri
 Brian Canham from Pseudo Echo
 Scott Carne from Kids in the Kitchen
 Chantoozies
 Cheetah
 The Choirboys
 Stephen Cummings of The Sports
 Joe Dolce
 Jon English
 Grace Knight and Bernie Lynch of Eurogliders
 Renée Geyer
 Frankie J. Holden
 Hush
 Brian Mannix
 Paul Norton
 James Reyne
 Leo Sayer
 Sherbet
 Alex Smith of Moving Pictures
 Wendy Stapleton (Wendy & the )
 Dave Sterry from Real Life
 Swanee
 Wilbur Wilde
 John Paul Young
 Ross Wilson and Mondo Rock
 Billy Miller of The Ferrets
 Goanna

The Melbourne concert was edited into a television special and DVD.

Countdown Spectacular 2
A second tour was held from Saturday 18 August to Wednesday 5 September 2007 in all major capital cities of Australia. This featured international artists as well as "a host of Australian Countdown favourites". Artists on the tour were:

 Birtles Shorrock Goble, the original members of Little River Band
 Graham Bonnet
 Kate Ceberano
 Richard Clapton
 Martha Davis from The Motels
 Doug Fieger from The Knack
 Samantha Fox
 Richard Gower from Racey
 Paul Gray from Wa Wa Nee
 Ignatius Jones from Jimmy And The Boys
 Katrina Leskanich from Katrina and the Waves
 Dave Mason from The Reels
 Les McKeown from The Bay City Rollers
 Doc Neeson and The Angels
 Sharon O'Neill
 David Paton from Pilot
 Plastic Bertrand
 The Radiators
 John Schumann from Redgum
 Robin Scott from M
 Rick Springfield
 Supernaut
 John Paul Young

The concerts were hosted by Ian "Molly" Meldrum, John Paul Young and Gavin Wood.

Awards and nominations

ARIA Music Awards
The ARIA Music Awards is an annual awards ceremony that recognises excellence, innovation, and achievement across all genres of Australian music. They commenced in 1987. 

! 
|-
| 2007
| The Countdown Spectacular Live
|rowspan="2" | Best Original Soundtrack, Cast or Show Album
| 
|rowspan="2" | 
|-
| 2008
| Countdown Spectacular 2
| 
|-

See also
 Countdown (Australian TV series)

References

External links
 
 

Australian music television series